Rachel McCoy (born August 1, 1995) is an American athlete who competes in the high jump.

In June 2021 she was ranked 19th in the world. She finished in a tie-breaker fourth place at the Olympic Trials, but by virtue of being one of only three Americans with the standard, was selected for the American team to compete at the delayed 2020 Tokyo Olympics.

McCoy had previously met the qualifying standard for the 2016 Olympics but finished 9th in the American 2016 Olympic Trials and was not selected.

McCoy qualified for Team USA for the 2nd time where she competed and placed 4th in the women's high jump at 2016 NACAC U23 Championships in Athletics.

Major competition record

National championships

College 
McCoy won the 2014 women's High Jump title at the Pacific Coast Athletic Conference Track and Field Championships clearing a  bar.

McCoy jumped  San Diego State Aztecs Invitational which qualified for the 2014 USATF U20 Outdoor Championships, where she made Team USA for the first time. McCoy placed 4th at 2014 World Junior Championships in Athletics in the High jump.

Prep 
McCoy is a 2013 graduate of A. B. Miller High School in Fontana, California where she set Miller high school records in High Jump , and Long Jump . Rachel McCoy also ran 100 Meters 12.57, 200 Meters 25.96 as a sophomore.

As a senior, McCoy won the girls high jump after she jumped  at the 2013 CIF California State Meet.
As a sophomore, McCoy won the girls high jump after she jumped  at the 2011 CIF California State Meet.

References

External links 
 
 Rachel McCoy profile for Team USA
 Rachel McCoy Athletic.net profile
 
 HSGT Track: Rachel McCoy, AB Miller, girls track athlete of the year interview

1995 births
Living people
American female high jumpers
Sportspeople from California
Track and field athletes from California
African-American female track and field athletes
African-American basketball players
American women's basketball players
African-American sportswomen
Athletes (track and field) at the 2020 Summer Olympics
Olympic track and field athletes of the United States
21st-century African-American sportspeople
21st-century African-American women